The baseball tournament at the 2019 Southeast Asian Games in the Philippines was held at the Clark International Sports Complex at The Villages, in Pampanga from 2 to 8 December 2019. The sport was only contested by men's national teams.

Participating nations
A total of 111 athletes from 5 nations participated (the numbers of athletes are shown in parentheses).

Competition schedule
The following is the competition schedule for the baseball competitions:

Squads

Opening round
All times are Philippine Standard Time (UTC+08:00).
The top four teams in each pool qualified for the medal events.

Results

Final round
All times are Philippine Standard Time (UTC+08:00).

Bronze medal game

Gold medal game

Final standings

Medalists

References

External links
 

2019
Southeast Asian Games